Emiliano Benjamín Yacobitti (born 15 December 1975) is an Argentine politician, currently serving as National Deputy elected in the City of Buenos Aires since 2019. He is a member of the Radical Civic Union (UCR), and served as the Buenos Aires City UCR Committee from 2013 to 2017.

A public accountant, Yacobitti has an extensive career in academic politics in the University of Buenos Aires, and formerly served as Vice-Dean of the University of Buenos Aires Faculty of Economic Sciences. Since 2022, he has been Vice Rector of the University of Buenos Aires.

Early life and career
Yacobitti was born on 15 December 1975 in Lomas de Zamora, in the Greater Buenos Aires conurbation. He attended the prestigious Escuela Superior de Comercio Carlos Pellegrini, then going on to study public accountancy at the University of Buenos Aires (UBA). He is married to Clara Alconada Alfonsín and has three children.

While studying at UBA, Yacobitti became involved with university politics. He was elected president of the Faculty of Economic Sciences student union, and later was elected president of the Argentine University Federation. He is also a professor of Accounting Systems in the Faculty of Economic Sciences. In 2018, he was elected Vice-Dean of the Faculty.

Political career
In 2013, Yacobitti was elected president of the Radical Civic Union Committee in Buenos Aires, for the 2013–2015 term. He was re-elected for another two-year term in 2015. Yacobitti was succeeded by Guillermo de Maya in 2017.

During his tenure as leader of the Buenos Aires UCR, Yacobitti rejected an alliance with Republican Proposal and the Civic Coalition ARI, breaking with the national UCR, which had formed part of the Cambiemos alliance in 2015. Instead, the Buenos Aires UCR formed the ECO coalition in 2015, which, alongside the Socialist Party, supported the candidacy of Martín Lousteau for Chief of Government of Buenos Aires in 2015. In 2017, ECO was dissolved and replaced by Evolución, which supported Lousteau's bid to become National Deputy in 2017.

Yacobitti ran for a seat in the Chamber of Deputies in the 2019 legislative election; he was the third candidate in the Juntos por el Cambio list in Buenos Aires. The list was the most voted, with 52.86% of the votes, and Yacobitti was elected.

As a national deputy, Yacobitti formed part of the parliamentary commissions on Justice, Tributary Norm Analysis, Science and Technology, Economy, Education, and General Legislation. He was a supporter of the legalization of abortion in Argentina, voting in favour of the 2020 Voluntary Interruption of Pregnancy bill that passed the Argentine Congress.

References

External links
Profile on the official website of the Chamber of Deputies (in Spanish)

Living people
1975 births
Members of the Argentine Chamber of Deputies elected in Buenos Aires
People from Lomas de Zamora
Politicians from Buenos Aires
Radical Civic Union politicians
University of Buenos Aires alumni
Academic staff of the University of Buenos Aires
21st-century Argentine politicians